The legislative districts of Cagayan de Oro are the representations of the highly urbanized city of Cagayan de Oro in the various national legislatures of the Philippines. The city is currently represented in the lower house of the Congress of the Philippines through its first and second congressional districts.

History 

Prior to gaining separate representation, areas now under the jurisdiction of Cagayan de Oro were represented under the historical Misamis Province (1907–1931), Misamis Oriental (1931–1969) and Region X (1978–1984).

By virtue of being classified as a highly urbanized city on November 22, 1983, Cagayan de Oro was granted separate representation for the first time in the Regular Batasang Pambansa, electing one representative, at large, in 1984.

Under the new Constitution which was proclaimed on February 11, 1987, the city constituted a lone congressional district, and elected its member to the restored House of Representatives starting that same year.

The passage of Republic Act No. 9371 on February 22, 2007 increased the city's representation by reapportioning it into two congressional districts: barangays west of the Cagayan de Oro River were constituted into the first district, and those lying east of the river, the second. The districts elected their separate representatives starting in  that year's elections.

1st District 
Barangays: Baikingon, Balulang, Bayabas, Bayanga, Besigan, Bonbon, Bulua, Calaanan, Canitoan, Carmen, Dansolihon, Iponan, Kauswagan, Lumbia, Mambuaya, Pagalungan, Pagatpat, Patag, Pigsag-an, San Simon, Taglimao, Tagpangi, Tignapoloan, Tuburan, Tumpagon
Population (2015): 333,476

2nd District 
Barangays: Barangays 1–40 (City Proper), Agusan, Balubal, Bugo, Camaman-an, Consolacion, Cugman, F.S. Catanico, Gusa, Indahag, Lapasan (Agora), Macabalan, Macasandig, Nazareth, Puerto, Puntod, Tablon
Population (2015): 342,474

Lone District (defunct)

At-Large (defunct)

See also 
Legislative districts of Misamis
Legislative districts of Misamis Oriental

References 

Cagayan de Oro
Politics of Cagayan de Oro